Ernest Hawksworth (6 December 1894–1961) was an English footballer who played in the Football League for Blackburn Rovers and New Brighton.

References

1894 births
1961 deaths
English footballers
Association football forwards
English Football League players
Rochdale A.F.C. players
Blackburn Rovers F.C. players
Macclesfield Town F.C. players
New Brighton A.F.C. players